Kaykhosro Pournazeri (born in Kermanshah, Iran; 21 June 1944) is a composer and musician who plays Tanbour.

He studied music with musicians Ostad Vaziri and Darvish Khan.

Kaykhosro Pornazeri founded the Shamss Ensemble in 1980 and combined Tanbour with the poetry of Rumi and the Daf frame drum. Tahmoures and Sohrab Pournazeri, his sons, are also members of this band.

References 

Iranian Kurdish people
1944 births
20th-century Iranian musicians
Musicians from Kermanshah
Living people
Music educators
Persian classical musicians
Tanbur players